was a Japanese actor.

Career
Born in Kure, Hiroshima, Kōyama joined the Bungakuza theatre troupe in 1952, first as a directorial assistant and then as an actor. He made his film debut in 1953 in Tadashi Imai's An Inlet of Muddy Water. He left Bungakuza in 1963 and participated in other troupes such as Gekidan Kumo and Engeki Shūdan En. He was also well known for his role in the hit TV show The Guardman.
He died in Kyoto Prefecture from pneumonia on 3 January 2017, 13 days before his 88th birthday.

Filmography

Film

Television

References

External links
 Shigeru Kōyama at Office Sasaki

1929 births
2017 deaths
Japanese male actors
People from Kure, Hiroshima
Japanese military personnel of World War II